The Campbell House, also known as Colony House #54 and Campbell-Bouwens-Hamming House, is a historic house at 1540 Inner Springer Loop Road, near Palmer, Alaska.  It is a simple -story wood-frame structure with a side gable roof.  It was designed by architect and community planner David Williams, and built in 1935 as part of the Matanuska Valley Colony project.  Of the 75 frame houses built as part of the colony, the Campbell House is one of the few that has survived, and is among the best-preserved.  The Campbell House property also retains the original, now restored outhouse, and the chicken coop.  At present time the Campbell House is the only colony home available to the public as a vacation rental.

The house was listed on the National Register of Historic Places in April 2013.  It is owned by Quarter 54 Colony Rentals LLC.

References

External links
 Campbell House website

1935 establishments in Alaska
Houses completed in 1935
Houses in Matanuska-Susitna Borough, Alaska
Houses on the National Register of Historic Places in Alaska
Buildings and structures on the National Register of Historic Places in Matanuska-Susitna Borough, Alaska